Catch Me is the sixth Korean studio album (eleventh overall) by South Korean pop duo TVXQ. It was digitally released on September 24, 2012, followed by a physical CD release on September 26, 2012, by SM Entertainment and KMP Holdings. The album is a follow-up to their 2011 release Keep Your Head Down, which was TVXQ's first album since becoming a two-piece band with members U-Know Yunho and Max Changmin.

The album spawned two lead singles, "Catch Me" and "Humanoids", the latter being the lead single off of Catch Me's repackage Humanoids, which was released on November 26, 2012. The repackaged edition also features dubstep track "Here I Stand." To support the album, TVXQ embarked on their first world tour, Catch Me World Tour, starting with two shows at Olympic Gymnastics Arena in Seoul in November 2012.

Catch Me is South Korea's third best-selling album of 2012. According to the Gaon Chart, Catch Me has sold 259,425 copies in South Korea as of March 2013, and an additional 47,181 copies in Japan, according to the Oricon.

Background, singles and music videos
On September 19 Changmin's teaser photo was released showing him with a mystic and intense look. The title track "Catch Me" is a powerful electropop with an orchestral melody, dubstep sound and house beats. It is about a self-respect man, who says good-bye to his lover but actually wants to hold onto her. On September 21 the teaser for the music video of "Catch Me" was released on their official YouTube channel. This was followed by the released of the full MV on the same day as the online release of the album.

Coinciding with the release of the repackage, lead single "Humanoids" was released on November 26, 2012. Produced and written by Kenzie, "Humanoids" is a mid-tempo EDM song with low-strung vocals, a higher range chorus, and robotic cadences. The lyrics are rather cynical – though it talks of rebuilding a better future, the new generation is stained with daunting fragments of the past.

The music video premiered on YouTube on November 26, featuring members U-Know Yunho and Max Changmin dancing in a dark futuristic backdrop. The choreography was created by NappyTabs. The music video was noted for its dystopian-like steampunk imagery. While the background maintained its washed-out gray undertone, Yunho and Changmin were dressed in color. Changmin wore bright colors, while Yunho carried darker attires, and the duo's contrasts in colors were maintained throughout the video. "Humanoids" underperformed on digital charts, peaking at number 32 on the Gaon Singles Chart with only around 157,000 downloads.

The third track "Here I Stand", produced and written by Kim Young-hu, is an upbeat, dubstep ballad. The lyrics describe the feelings of a long-distance relationship.

Promotion and reception
 
The duo made their comeback on October 5 on KBS Music Bank. They performed their title track "Catch Me", and "I Don′t Know". This was followed by appearances on October 6 and 7 on MBC Show! Music Core and SBS Inkigayo, respectively.

Catch Me ranked number one on Gaon Album Chart for three consecutive weeks and again a week later but ranked second for the month of September selling 131,882 copies. In October it peaked at number one with 114,956 copies, selling a cumulative total of 246,838 copies.

On November 17, TVXQ performed "Humanoids" for the first time at their two-day concert in Seoul, South Korea, the first leg of their Live World Tour: Catch Me. On November 19, the teaser for "Humanoids" was unveiled online, followed by the announcement of the repackage album, which was released on November 26.

Track listing

Charts

Weekly charts

Monthly charts

Year-end charts

Sales

Release history

See also
TVXQ albums discography
List of number-one albums of 2012 (South Korea)

References

External links
 TVXQ official homepage  
 TVXQ official YouTube channel

2012 albums
TVXQ albums
SM Entertainment albums
KMP Holdings albums
Korean-language albums
Albums produced by the Underdogs (production team)